Vatsiana, on the island of Gavdos in the Chania regional unit of Crete in Greece, is the most southernly settlement in Europe.  , the village's total population was 23; though, in the summer, the number of people on the island increases to a few thousand due to tourism.

Chania (regional unit)
Mediterranean port cities and towns in Greece
Populated places in Chania (regional unit)